Lethon 'Lee' Flowers (born January 14, 1973) is a former safety who played for the Pittsburgh Steelers most of his 8 years in the NFL from 1995–2002. He played college football for the Georgia Tech Yellow Jackets.

References 

1973 births
Living people
American football safeties
Players of American football from Columbia, South Carolina
Georgia Tech Yellow Jackets football players
Pittsburgh Steelers players
Denver Broncos players